Matlapa is a town and municipality in San Luis Potosí in central Mexico.

Climate

References

Notes

Municipalities of San Luis Potosí